La Granja d'Escarp is a municipality in the comarca of the Segrià in Catalonia, Spain.

The town is located at the confluence of the Segre and Cinca rivers.

The monastery of La Granja d'Escarp was founded by Cistercian monks in 1213. La Granja d'Escarp has lost some population since year 1920 when it reached a peak of 1,366 inhabitants. The economy is based on the produce of fruit trees growing in irrigated fields. The area enjoyed some prosperity in the past owing to nearby coal mines.

See also
Montmeneu

References

External links 

La Granja d'Escarp - Pàgina web de l'Ajuntament
 Government data pages 

Municipalities in Segrià
Populated places in Segrià